Bruce Stephen Percy (born 15 June 1966) is a former English cricketer.  Percy was a right-handed batsman who bowled right-arm medium pace.  He was born in Horsforth, Yorkshire.

Percy made his debut for Buckinghamshire in the 1986 Minor Counties Championship against Berkshire.  Percy played Minor counties cricket for Buckinghamshire from 1986 to 2001, which included 50 Minor Counties Championship matches and 20 MCCA Knockout Trophy matches.  In 1990, he made his List A debut against Nottinghamshire in the NatWest Trophy.  He played 7 further List A matches for Buckinghamshire, the last coming against the Kent Cricket Board in the 2001 Cheltenham & Gloucester Trophy.  In his 8 List A matches, he scored 59 runs at a batting average of 8.42, with a high score of 19.  With the ball he took 3 wickets at a bowling average of 27.66, with best figures of 1/2.

References

External links
Bruce Percy at ESPNcricinfo
Bruce Percy at CricketArchive

1966 births
Living people
People from Horsforth
English cricketers
Buckinghamshire cricketers
Sportspeople from Yorkshire